"Fun" is a song by British alternative rock band Coldplay, featuring Swedish singer Tove Lo. It is the sixth track from their seventh studio album, A Head Full of Dreams (2015). The song was produced by the band's long-time record producer Rik Simpson along with Norwegian production duo Stargate.

Background and recording

The song was recorded by the band during sessions for their seventh studio album in 2014, at their purpose-built studios The Bakery and The Beehive in North London, England, both originally constructed for work on their three previous studio albums, 2008's Viva la Vida or Death and All His Friends, 2011's Mylo Xyloto and 2014's Ghost Stories respectively.

Composition
"Fun" has been described as an "uplifting, airy scene bolstered by the beautifully-meshed duet" with Tove Lo, who joins Chris Martin in singing, "Didn't we have fun? Don't say it's all a waste." Martin's vocals are preceded by a "distant, distorted" guitar part. The song has electronic heartbeats over some Coldplay's mid-tempo work, with a "Cure-style darkness towards the end".

Stereogums Tom Breihan called "Fun" a "divorce" song, referring to Martin's breakup with Gwyneth Paltrow, and said the song ends "with the suggestion that maybe they'll get back together someday". The song has the name title and concept as another song written by Chris Martin in 2008, which was left off Viva la Vida or Death and All His Friends and was released by Australian singer-songwriter Natalie Imbruglia.

Reception
Judah Joseph of The Huffington Post said Martin's and Tove Lo's vocals "[weaved] seamlessly", and he complimented the former for his "effortless" crooning. Referring to Martin's allusion to his separation from Paltrow, Tom Breihan of Stereogum wrote, "It’s a rare moment of acute, cutting humanity from a songwriter who tends to prefer sloppy vagaries." Furthermore, he said, "And goofy though it may be, I like that Coldplay are still pretentious enough to build an entire song from a few piano tones and a recitation of an ancient Rumi poem.

Personnel
Credits are adapted from A Head Full of Dreams liner notes.
Coldplay
Guy Berryman – bass guitar, keyboards
Jonny Buckland – lead guitar, keyboards
Will Champion – drums, programming
Chris Martin – lead vocals, acoustic guitar

Additional musicians
Mikkel S Eriksen – additional instruments, production, mixing
Tor Erik Hermansen – additional instruments, production, mixing
Tove Lo – featured vocals
Rik Simpson – audio mixer

Charts and certifications

Weekly charts

Certifications

References

External links
 Fun at Coldplay's website

2015 songs
Coldplay songs
Song recordings produced by Rik Simpson
Song recordings produced by Stargate (record producers)
Songs written by Chris Martin
Songs written by Guy Berryman
Songs written by Jonny Buckland
Songs written by Will Champion
Tove Lo songs
Male–female vocal duets